Seqocrypta is a genus of Australian brushed trapdoor spiders first described by Robert Raven in 1994.

Species
 it contains four species:
Seqocrypta bancrofti Raven, 1994 – Australia (New South Wales)
Seqocrypta hamlynharrisi Raven & Churchill, 1994 – Australia (Queensland)
Seqocrypta jakara Raven, 1994 (type) – Australia (Queensland, New South Wales)
Seqocrypta mckeowni Raven, 1994 – Australia (New South Wales)

References

Barychelidae
Mygalomorphae genera
Spiders of Australia